Ni Xiance (born 1935) is a People's Republic of China politician. He was governor of Jiangxi (1985-1986).

References

1935 births
Governors of Jiangxi
Vice-governors of Jiangxi
Living people